George S. Oldfield is a financial economist. He has been published extensively, and is cited for his work on the effects of a firm's unvested pension benefits on its share price published in the Journal of Money, Credit and Banking in 1977.

He was the Richard S. Reynolds, Jr. Professor of Finance at the Mason School of Business at the College of William & Mary, and a faculty member at the Amos Tuck School of Business Administration at Dartmouth College and the S.C. Johnson Graduate School of Management at Cornell University.  He is the 2002 recipient of the Business Week Business School Survey "Master Teacher" award.

He is a consultant with The Brattle Group, and in government, has worked at the Federal Reserve Bank of New York, the Federal Reserve Bank of Philadelphia and served as Economic Research Fellow  at the U.S. Securities and Exchange Commission where he focused on employee stock option and financial derivatives pricing, disclosure rules for corporate pension funding and executive compensation and asset-backed and mortgage-backed securities.

He holds a Ph.D. and M.A. in finance from the Wharton School at the University of Pennsylvania and an A.B. in economics from the College of William and Mary.

Publications

Oldfield's other publications include:

References

Living people
American financial businesspeople
Financial economists
Dartmouth College faculty
Cornell University faculty
Wharton School of the University of Pennsylvania alumni
College of William & Mary alumni
Mason School of Business faculty
Year of birth missing (living people)